Peter Közle (born 18 November 1967 in Trostberg) is a retired German football player.

Club career

Club statistics

References

External links
 
 Peter Közle at skynet.be

1967 births
Living people
German footballers
Cercle Brugge K.S.V. players
BSC Young Boys players
Grasshopper Club Zürich players
MSV Duisburg players
VfL Bochum players
1. FC Union Berlin players
Bundesliga players
2. Bundesliga players
Association football midfielders
Association football forwards
SV 19 Straelen players
Old Xaverians SC players